Online bingo is the game of bingo (either the US or UK variant) played on the Internet and its estimated launch was in 1996. It is estimated that the global gross gaming yield of bingo (excluding the United States) was US$500 million in 2006, and it is forecasted to grow to $1 billion by 2010.

Unlike balls used in regular bingo halls, online bingo sites use a random number generator. Most bingo halls also offer links to online poker and casino offerings as the patrons are often in the target market. One notable feature of online bingo is the chat functionality. Bingo sites strive to foster a sense of community and interaction between players as this helps customer retention.

History
One of the earliest known online bingo games, launched in 1996, was a free bingo game called "Bingo Zone". To play, members had to provide demographic information; in turn, members would receive targeted ads based on the demographics provided. Another early pioneer for free online bingo was Uproar, which launched Bingo Blitz in 1998.

Legality
The game of bingo has been able to sidestep many of the laws which ban gambling online. In England, for instance, section 65 of the 1928 Royal Commission Report on Gambling states, “Bingo is a lottery played as a game.”  The report details that a game of chance is different than that of casino games, even requiring separate licensing. Since each bingo participant receives a random set of numbers, the chances of winning for each participant are equal. The Royal Commission Report has given the game of bingo a chance to thrive in the highly contested cyber gambling community.

Playing
Playing bingo online, players can make use of optional features which make playing the game easier, such as auto-daub. Auto-daub automatically marks off the numbers on cards as they are called, so players don't have to. Most software providers support other gaming features as "Best Card Sorting" and "Best Card Highlighting" where players cards are sorted and highlighted by closest to bingo.

There is variety among the different kinds of bingo games that can be played. For example, some inexpensive game rooms appeal to the player who may want to play for as little as 3 cents or 3 pence per card, some bingo games only allow players to purchase the same number of cards so they are not competing against the "high rollers" out there who buy many cards for the same game.

UK
Bingo is a popular leisure activity for people in the UK. The UK market has seen an influx in big brand names launching bingo games on their already established websites in addition to a number established land based operators including Mecca and Gala also entering the market. More recently "charity bingo"  has become established.

From April 2009 and March 2014 the UK Gambling Commission has been monitoring how many people are gambling. From April 2013 and March 2014 there was a 6% increase in people gambling compared to the same time last year with over £6.8 billion spent including Bingo. In the same period there was also a 22% increase in people playing Bingo on their mobile phones. In 2013, 102,715 people were employed across the gambling industry in the UK, signaling a 5.3% drop from 2012.

Since November 2017, Tombola, a UK-based online gaming company, sponsors the British TV series I'm a Celebrity...Get Me Out of Here!. Tombola had previously sponsored Emmerdale on ITV for three years.

Software
Some online bingo developers are: RedRake Gaming, Microgaming, Wazdan, Playtech and Gamesys.

In March 2022, the deal between Bally’s Gamesys and Gaming Arts significantly contributed to popularizing online bingo on the US internet gambling market.

See also
Problem gambling

Further reading
Moubarac, Jean-Claude; Shead, N Will; Derevensky, Jeffrey L. Journal of Gambling Issues 24: 164–184. July 2010. Archived 10 April 2012.
Gainsbury, Sally (2012). Internet Gambling: Current Research Findings and Implications. Springer. pp. 21–22.

References

Bingo
Bingo